The Twin Mountain and Potomac Railroad was built in 1911 to haul fruit from Twin Mountain Orchards to Keyser.  It was a  narrow gauge railroad and the freight was transferred to the Baltimore and Ohio Railroad at Keyser.  The Burlington, West Virginia train station survives and is now used as a branch of the Mineral County Library.

Transportation in Mineral County, West Virginia
Defunct West Virginia railroads
Narrow gauge railroads in West Virginia
3 ft gauge railways in the United States
Railway companies established in 1911
American companies established in 1911